Pool A of the 2023 Rugby World Cup will begin on 8 September 2023. The pool includes hosts France, and previous three-time champions New Zealand and Italy. They are joined by the Americas 1 and Africa 1.

Teams

Notes

Standings

Matches

France vs New Zealand

Italy vs Namibia

France vs Uruguay

Notes:
This is the first ever meeting between these two sides at a World Cup.

New Zealand vs Namibia

Italy vs Uruguay

Notes:
This is the first ever meeting between these two sides at a World Cup.

France vs Namibia

Uruguay vs Namibia

Notes:
This is the first ever meeting between these two sides at a World Cup.

New Zealand vs Italy

New Zealand vs Uruguay

Notes:
This is the first ever meeting between these two sides at a World Cup.

France vs Italy

References

Pool A
2023–24 in French rugby union
2023–24 in Italian rugby union
2023 in New Zealand rugby union